In Greek mythology, Autonoë was a Theban princess as the eldest daughter of Cadmus, founder of Thebes in Boeotia, and the goddess Harmonia. She was the wife of Aristaeus and mother of Actaeon and possibly Macris.

Mythology

Euripides' account 
In Euripides' play, The Bacchae, she and her sisters were driven into a bacchic frenzy by the god Dionysus (her nephew) when Pentheus, the king of Thebes, refused to allow his worship in the city.  When Pentheus came to spy on their revels, Agave, the mother of Pentheus and Autonoë's sister, spotted him in a tree. They tore him to pieces in their Bacchic fury. The murder of Pentheus was brought by Dionysus as retribution for Pentheus's lack of piety for the gods.

Actaeon, the son of Autonoë, was eaten by his own hounds as punishment for glimpsing Artemis naked. At last, grief and sadness at the lamentable fate of the house of her father induced Autonoe to quit Thebes to go to Ereneia, a village of the Megarians, where she died.

Oppian's account 
According to Oppian, Autonoe along with her sisters Ino and Agave became the nurses of the infant Dionysus, son of Semele their sister.

 For Ino, scion of Agenor, reared the infant Bacchus and first gave her breast to the son of Zeus, and Autonoe likewise and Agave joined in nursing him, but not in the baleful halls of Athamas, but on the mountain which at that time men called by the name of the Thigh (Μηρός). For greatly fearing the mighty spouse of Zeus and dreading the tyrant Pentheus, son of Echion, they laid the holy child in a coffer of pine and covered it with fawn-skins and wreathed it with clusters of the vine, in a grotto where round the child they danced the mystic dance and beat drums and clashed cymbals in their hands, to veil the cries of the infant. It was around that hidden ark that they first showed forth their mysteries, and with them the Aonian women secretly took paint rites. And they arrayed a gathering of their faithful companions to journey from that mountain out of the Boeotian land. For now, now was it fated that a land, which before was wild, should cultivate the vine at the instance of Dionysus who delivers from sorrow. Then the holy choir took up secret coffer and wreathed it and set it on the back of an ass. And they came unto the shores of the Euripus, where they found a seafaring old man with his sons, and all together they besought the fishermen that they might cross the water in their boats. Then the old man had compassion on them and received on board the holy women. And lo! on the benches of his boat flowered the lush bindweed and blooming vine and ivy wreathed the stern. Now would the fishermen, cowering in god-sent terror, have dived into the sea, but ere that the boat came to land. And to Euboea the women came, carrying the god, and to the abode of Aristaeus, who dwelt in a cave on the top of a mountain at Caryae and who instructed the life of country-dwelling men in countless things; he was the first to establish a flock of sheep; he first pressed the fruit of the oily wild olive, first curdled milk with rennet, and brought the gentle bees from the oak and shut them up in hives. He at that time received the infant Dionysus from coffer of Ino and reared him in his cave and nursed him with the help of the Dryads and the Nymphs that have the bees in their keeping and the maidens of Euboea and the Aonian women.

Nonnus' account 
In Nonnus, Dionysiaca 5.212, the marriage of Aristaeus and Autonoë and the fate of their son Actaeon was described in the following lines:

 Kadmos (Cadmus) [king of Thebes] now chose husbands for his daughters, and gave them over in four successive bridals, settling their weddings one by one. First Aristaios (Aristaeus) laden with gifts, he of the herds and he of the wilds, as he was named, the flood of allwise Apollon and Kyrene (Cyrene) so ready with her hands, wedded Autonoe according to the rules of lawful marriage. Agenorides (Kadmos son of Agenor) did not refuse his daughter to a good son well acquainted with the art of feeding many; nay, he gave her to a very clever husband, a lifesaving son of Apollon, after he head calmed the pestilential star of fiery Maira [Sirius the Dog Star] by the life-preserving breezes of heaven-sent [Etesian] winds. The wedding-feast also was very rich, since he gave the unyoked maid oxen for her treasure, he gave goats, he gave mountain-bred flocks; many a line of burden-bearers was forced to lift the load of great jars full of olive-oil, his marriage gifts, much travail of the clever honeybee he brought, in the riddled comb her masterpiece . . . [the blessings that Aristaios conferred on man follow, see the Blessings of Aristaios below.] This was he, the Keian (Cean) son of Phoibos (Phoebus), whom Eros (Love) escorted to the Aonian wedding. All the city [of Thebes] wreathed in garlands was busy about the cattle-sacrifice, and the straighcut streets were all busy dancing. Before the gates of the bridal chamber the people twirled their reeling legs for the wedding; the women struck up a lovely sounding noise of melody, the Aionian hoboys tootled with the bridal pipes.
 Afterwards from the bed of Aristaios and Autonoe, arose Aktaion (Actaeon). His passion was for the rocks; and having in him the blood of the Hunter. . . [But he once came across Artemis bathing naked, was transformed into a stag and torn apart by his own hounds.]
 Pheme (Rumour) self born had flown from the hills to Autonoe, proclaiming her son's [Aktaion's] fate torn to pieces by his dogs . . . Old Kadmos shore off his hoary hair, Harmonia cried aloud; the whole house resounded heavy booming with the noise of women wailing in concert. Autonoe along with Aristaios her husband went in search of the scattered remains of the dead. She saw her son, but knew him not; she beheld the shape of a dappled deer and saw no aspect of a man. Often she passed the bones of a fawn unrecognized, lying on the ground, and did not understand; for her boy was dead, and she looked to find him in human shape . . . Passing over the forest ridges with wandering feet, she trod the rough back of the rugged hill, unshod, with loosened robe, and returned home form the mountain ranging task; grieving for her unsuccessful cares she fell asleep at last beside her husband, unhappy father! Both were haunted by shadowy dreams, their eyes glimpsing the wing of a nightingale sleep.
 The young man's ghost stood by his disconsolate father, wearing the shadowy form of a dappled stag; but from his eyelids he poured tears of understanding and spoke with a human voice : ‘You sleep, my father, and you know not my fate. Wake, and recognise my unknown changeling looks; wake, and embrace the horn of a stag you love . . . [Aktaion tells his father the circumstances of his death and requests proper burial.] I heard that Phoibos, the Archeress's brother, slept with Kyrene and begat my father, and I thought to draw Artemis to marriage in the family . . .
 So spoke the dream the intelligent pricket, and without warning it was flown and gone. Autonoe's husband leapt up, and threw off the wing of this revealing sleep. He aroused his wife much disturbed, and described her boy's strong-horned animal form, and recounted the story which the intelligent fawn had told. Then there was more lamentation.

 Genealogy 

 Notes 

 References 

 Apollodorus, The Library with an English Translation by Sir James George Frazer, F.B.A., F.R.S. in 2 Volumes, Cambridge, MA, Harvard University Press; London, William Heinemann Ltd. 1921. ISBN 0-674-99135-4. Online version at the Perseus Digital Library. Greek text available from the same website.
Diodorus Siculus, The Library of History translated by Charles Henry Oldfather. Twelve volumes. Loeb Classical Library. Cambridge, Massachusetts: Harvard University Press; London: William Heinemann, Ltd. 1989. Vol. 3. Books 4.59–8. Online version at Bill Thayer's Web Site
 Diodorus Siculus, Bibliotheca Historica. Vol 1-2. Immanel Bekker. Ludwig Dindorf. Friedrich Vogel. in aedibus B. G. Teubneri. Leipzig. 1888–1890. Greek text available at the Perseus Digital Library.
 Gaius Julius Hyginus, Fabulae from The Myths of Hyginus translated and edited by Mary Grant. University of Kansas Publications in Humanistic Studies. Online version at the Topos Text Project.
 Hesiod, Theogony from The Homeric Hymns and Homerica with an English Translation by Hugh G. Evelyn-White, Cambridge, MA.,Harvard University Press; London, William Heinemann Ltd. 1914. Online version at the Perseus Digital Library. Greek text available from the same website.
 Nonnus of Panopolis, Dionysiaca translated by William Henry Denham Rouse (1863-1950), from the Loeb Classical Library, Cambridge, MA, Harvard University Press, 1940.  Online version at the Topos Text Project.
 Nonnus of Panopolis, Dionysiaca. 3 Vols. W.H.D. Rouse. Cambridge, MA., Harvard University Press; London, William Heinemann, Ltd. 1940–1942. Greek text available at the Perseus Digital Library.
 Pausanias, Description of Greece with an English Translation by W.H.S. Jones, Litt.D., and H.A. Ormerod, M.A., in 4 Volumes. Cambridge, MA, Harvard University Press; London, William Heinemann Ltd. 1918. Online version at the Perseus Digital Library
 Pausanias, Graeciae Descriptio. 3 vols''. Leipzig, Teubner. 1903.  Greek text available at the Perseus Digital Library.

Princesses in Greek mythology
Theban characters in Greek mythology
Theban mythology
Dionysus in mythology